Hodes is a surname. Notable people with the surname include:

Art Hodes (1904–1993), American jazz pianist
Charlie Hodes (1848–1875), American baseball player
Charlotte Hodes (born 1959), English artist
Henry I. Hodes (1899–1962), United States Army general
Louis Hodes (1934–2008), American mathematician, computer scientist and cancer researcher
Paul Hodes (born 1951), American politician
Richard S. Hodes (1924–2002), American politician
Rick Hodes (born 1953), American physician